KLJZ (93.1 FM, "Z93") is a commercial radio station in Yuma, Arizona, United States. KLJZ airs a hot adult contemporary format.

History
KVOY-FM was licensed in 1972 as a sister station of KVOY (AM), changing its calls to KJOK the next year. Current owner Keith Lewis acquired KJOK and KEZC-AM (the former KVOY AM) in 1997. KJOK became KLJZ in 1997.

References

External links

LJZ
Hot adult contemporary radio stations in the United States